Yegor Andreyevich Sorokin (born 4 November 1995) is a Russian professional footballer who plays as a centre-back for FC Krasnodar.

Club career
He made his debut in the Russian Premier League on 14 September 2014 for FC Rubin Kazan in a game against FC Rostov. It took him 3 years to appear for the main Rubin squad again, when he started a game against FC SKA-Khabarovsk on 13 August 2017. He became a regular for Rubin in the 2017–18 season. On 9 December 2018, he scored twice to secure a 2–1 away victory over the league-leading FC Zenit St. Petersburg.

On 2 September 2019, he signed a 5-year contract with FC Krasnodar and was loaned back to Rubin for the remainder of the 2019–20 season. On 30 December 2019, Krasnodar exercised their option to terminate the loan early.

International
He was called up to the national team for the first time for games against Turkey and Czech Republic in September 2018. He made his debut on 10 September 2018 in a friendly against Czech Republic.

Career statistics

Club

References

External links
 
 
 

1995 births
Living people
Footballers from Saint Petersburg
Russian footballers
Russia international footballers
Association football defenders
FC Tosno players
FC Rubin Kazan players
FC Aktobe players
FC Neftekhimik Nizhnekamsk players
FC Krasnodar players
Russian Premier League players
Russian First League players
Russian Second League players
Kazakhstan Premier League players
Russian expatriate footballers
Expatriate footballers in Kazakhstan
Russian expatriate sportspeople in Kazakhstan